Sotorribas is a municipality of Spain located in the province of Cuenca, Castilla–La Mancha. As of 1 January 2020, it has a registered population of 700. The municipality spans across a total area of 149.21 km2.

References

Municipalities in the Province of Cuenca